The Bystry Canal, is a feeder canal for the Augustów Canal which was built during the 19th century in the present-day Podlaskie Voivodeship of northeastern Poland (then the Augustów Voivodeship of the Kingdom of Poland).

History
It was built in the years 1834–1835. The primary purpose was the draining of excess water from the Augustów Canal. The canal flows into the north side of the Sajno Lake. The canal is used as a trail for canoeing, and is sometimes frequented by anglers. On the banks are several species of aquatic birds like swans, ducks, grebes.

Canal infrastructure

The canal is a fairly lively stream channel at the beginning. A street named after Ludwik Waryński, an activist and theoretician of the socialist movement in Poland, runs along the right bank of the canal. There are a number of houses along the edge of the water with a number of small private docks for boats and for fishing.

After  the channel becomes deeper, and changes from an urban character to a suburban character, especially after reaching on both sides of the spruce forest. At the  mark the canal crosses under Bohaterów Westerplatte Street (Voivodeship Road 664) which runs from Augustów south-east towards the Belarus border near Hrodna, Belarus.

Next the canal passes through a forested area of spruce, pine and occasionally rising just above the water alders and willows. Here and there on the edges, especially on the left, on the bank of a dry, comfortable place to rest and camping.

The  mark on the canal is the canal estuary Sajno Lake with the shore of the lake among the reeds.

At the end of the canal the banks are quite high, accessible, with places to rest. At the mouth of the right there is a dock for fishing boats.

References

External links
 pre-1939 photos (Narodowe Archiwum Cyfrowe) 
 Zdjęcie 1, Zdjęcie 2 

19th-century establishments in Poland
Canals in Poland
Establishments in Congress Poland
Canals opened in 1835